Nuuk Art Museum is a national museum in Greenland, located in Nuuk, the capital. The museum contains a notable collection of paintings, watercolors, drawings, graphics, figures in soapstone, ivory, and wood, with many items collected by the businessman Svend Junge. Of particular note is a collection of over 150 paintings by Emanuel A. Petersen.

Establishment

The museum was founded on 22 May 2005, occupying a former Seventh-day Adventist Church building in Kissarneqqortuunnguaq, Nuuk. The museum was donated to the citizens of the Municipality of Nuuk on the same day by Svend and Helene Junge. The art museum was completed and inaugurated on 21 June 2007, Greenland National Day.

See also
 List of Greenlandic artists

References

External links
 Nuuk Art Museum website

2005 establishments in Greenland
Museums established in 2005
Museums in Nuuk
Art museums and galleries in Greenland
National museums
Arts in Nuuk
Former churches
Churches in Greenland